Gordon Thomas Lawrence Lane (born March 31, 1953) is a Canadian former  professional ice hockey player. Lane played in the National Hockey League for the 
Washington Capitals and New York Islanders. Lane was a member of the Islanders team that won four Stanley Cups in the 1980s.

Lane played junior in the WCHL, first with the Brandon Wheat Kings and, after a trade, with the New Westminster Bruins.  A strong training ethic and quality coaching resulted in Lane being selected in the NHL draft.

Originally selected in the 1973 NHL Entry Draft by the Pittsburgh Penguins, Lane was signed to a minor league contract with the Fort Wayne Komets.  He was subsequently traded to the Dayton Gems, farm team to the Washington Capitals.  After winning the Turner Cup with the Dayton Gems, coach Tom McVie and several Gems players were promoted to the Washington Capitals.  Signed by the Capitals in 1976, Lane played parts of five seasons, leading the team in penalties in three of those seasons. Unhappy about his playing time with the Caps, he threatened retirement during the 1979–80 season. He was eventually traded to the New York Islanders for forward Mike Kaszycki on December 7, 1979, remaining with that club for the rest of his NHL career.

Lane's first game for the Isles was against the New York Rangers at Madison Square Garden, a 5–4 loss. Lane immediately made his presence known during the game, throwing several hits while also getting involved in several scrums. Lane's tough, defensive abilities did not go unappreciated by Islanders head coach Al Arbour, who, like Lane, was a stay-at-home defenceman during his own playing career. Lane helped guide the Islanders steady defence during their four straight Stanley Cup championships (1980, 1981, 1982, and 1983).

Early in the 1984 playoffs, Lane was injured and missed most of the Islanders' playoff run. Lane's presence was sorely missed in the Cup finals, as the Edmonton Oilers outskated the tired, battered, and undermanned Islanders, dethroning the four-time champions. An underrated enforcer who never failed to come to the aid of a teammate in trouble, Lane has been credited over the years with being the Islanders' most effective defender during their Stanley Cup runs.

Awards and achievements
Turner Cup (IHL) championship (1976)
Stanley Cup championships (1980, 1981, 1982, and 1983)
"Honoured member" of the Manitoba Hockey Hall of Fame

External links

Profile at hockeydraftcentral.com
Gord Lane's biography  at Manitoba Hockey Hall of Fame

1953 births
Living people
Brandon Wheat Kings players
Canadian ice hockey defencemen
Dayton Gems players
Hampton Gulls (SHL) players
Hershey Bears players
Ice hockey people from Manitoba
New Westminster Bruins players
New York Islanders players
New York Islanders scouts
Pittsburgh Penguins draft picks
Sportspeople from Brandon, Manitoba
Springfield Indians coaches
Springfield Indians players
Stanley Cup champions
Washington Capitals players
Canadian ice hockey coaches